Dillwynia elegans is a species of flowering plant in the family Fabaceae and is endemic to eastern New South Wales. It is an erect shrub with more or less cylindrical, grooved leaves and yellow flowers with red markings.

Description
The flowers are arranged in pairs in leaf axils, in clusters near the ends of branches.

Taxonomy
Dillwynia elegans was first formally described in 1839 by Stephan Endlicher in Novarum stirpium decades editae a Museo Caesario Palatino Vindobonensi from a specimen growing in Charles von Hügel's garden. 

This species is regarded as a synonym of Dillwynia floribunda var. teretifolia (DC.) Blakely by the National Herbarium of New South Wales.

Distribution and habitat
This dillwynia grows on rocky, sandy ridges in heath and forest from Port Jackson to near Rylstone.

References 

elegans
Fabales of Australia
Flora of New South Wales
Plants described in 1839
Taxa named by Stephan Endlicher